Sam Kratz is a fictional character from the Australian soap opera Neighbours, played by Richard Grieve. He made his first screen appearance during the episode broadcast on 13 June 1994. Grieve quit the serial two years later and Sam departed on 21 June 1996. Grieve reprised his role in April 2005 for Neighbours' 20th anniversary episode.

Casting
After studying drama for four years and acting in the various theatre productions, Grieve won the part of Sam in 1994. He relocated from Sydney to Melbourne for filming. Neighbours was Grieve's first major television role. He later stated that he had no regrets about taking on a continuing role on the soap, saying "I'm thrilled with the way things have gone. I was very nervous when I first started because it was a long-running job but it's turned out well." Grieve made his first appearance as Sam during the episode broadcast 13 June 1994.

Development

Characterisation
Sam was sent to Ramsay Street by his grandmother, Marlene (Moya O'Sullivan), to check out the house she had purchased. He befriended Brett Stark (Brett Blewitt) and his sister, Danni (Eliza Szonert), who started looking up to him, as she thought he was "glamorous". When Marlene arrived in town, she revealed to Sam that Brett and Danni were actually his cousins. Grieve told Amanda Ruben from TV Week that "Sam is just an upfront, natural guy, who gets around on his friendly charm." The actor added that Sam's main passion is his motorbike. He also displays "a love of freedom" which makes him loath to settle down. Ruben revealed that Sam would secure a job at the local coffee shop and his "rugged good looks" would make him popular. Josephine Monroe, author of Neighbours: The First 10 Years, stated that after a shaky start, Sam became popular in Ramsay Street and added "Sam may look rough, with his stubble and oil stains, but he has proven himself to be a rough diamond." Serena Coneele from Inside Soap described Sam as being good-looking and nice, but revealed that he would have a few secrets up his sleeve. Grieve told the writer, "Sam's unreal, I'd love to be more like him. I worry a lot more than he does and I've got a really bad temper. He's friendly and laid-back, and before long, he knows everyone in Erinsborough. He's that kind of guy!" The actor added that wherever Sam went, trouble and disaster seemed to follow him around. He later revealed that he would have liked Sam to have had more of a dark side, as he could be too good to be true at times.

Squirrel
After Sam chaperones a high school dance, he attracts the attentions of Squirrel (Brooke Howden), a young student who becomes "glued to him like a fly in Vegemite." When Sam goes away on holiday with the students, Squirrel makes it clear that she has more than a crush on him. She eventually corners him and announces that she is pregnant with his child. Grieve revealed "Squirrel turns out to be a bit of a psycho! She is pregnant and she's convinced herself that Sam is the father, but he can't be because they haven't even slept together." Inside Soap's Victoria Ross commented that the Squirrel situation comes about just as Sam's life seems to be on "a general downward spiral". He had spent weeks fighting his feelings for Annalise Hartman (Kimberley Davies), who was due to get married. When her wedding was called off, Sam provided Annalise with a shoulder to cry on. But before he could declare his feelings for her, Squirrel's revelation made him think twice. Grieve told Ross, "Sam doesn't tell anyone about Squirrel's accusation because he's convinced that no one will believe his story, especially Annalise. When Sam eventually tells Annalise about Squirrel's accusations, their relationship turns around because she totally believes his story and agrees to stick by him. Their friendship grows into something more serious so I suppose Squirrel did him a favour."

Departure and 2005 appearance
Grieve departed the serial in 1996. He quit his role in order to play the lead in the West End production of Grease. However, as he was filming his final scenes, Grieve was informed that his application for a British work visa had been turned down. Grieve stated that he was ready to leave Neighbours, and hoped to secure theatre work in Australia instead.

On 14 April 2005, Kris Green from Digital Spy reported that Grieve had reprised his role for the Neighbours''' 20th anniversary episode, "Friends for Twenty Years", which was broadcast in July.

Storylines
Sam arrives in Ramsay Street when his grandmother Marlene buys Number 24 Ramsay Street from Madge Bishop (Anne Charleston). Sam moves into the house but mistakenly sells the furniture belonging to Lou Carpenter (Tom Oliver), the previous tenant instead of the old furniture Marlene has shipped to the house. This leads to Lou suspecting Sam of being dodgy but ultimately changes his mind after the mistake is explained. Sam quickly makes friends with local teenagers Brett and Danni Stark who live next door at Number 22 with their mother Cheryl (Caroline Gillmer) and Lou and is later told by Marlene that the Stark kids and Cheryl are his cousins and aunt, respectively.

Annalise Hartman catches Sam's eye, but she is engaged to Mark Gottlieb (Bruce Samazan) who she is living with. Squirrel, one of Brett and Danni's classmates, takes a liking to Sam after he chaperones a dance. Sam rebuffs Squirrel, but she later returns and tells him he is the father of her baby. This is proved to be untrue when Danni urges Squirrel to confess. When Annalise returns after a holiday to get over Mark jilting her at the altar and later a cancer scare, Sam confesses his love for her and the two become an item. Sam's father, Patrick (Shane Porteous) arrives in Erinsborough keen to build bridges with his son but Sam is less than eager to reconcile with him as he and his mother had often left Sam in Marlene's care as a child while they furthered their careers.  Sam is further angered when Patrick tells him that he has separated from Sarah, Sam's mother. The two men eventually reconcile after a going on a Bush Retreat.

Sam notices Annalise becoming more and more distant and shows disinterest in their sex life. It soon emerges that Annalise is having an affair with Stonefish Rebecchi (Anthony Engelman). Sam is upset and throws Annalise out. Things are not helped when Sam goes to visit Annalise at a motel and finds Stonie there. This results in Sam punching Stonie. Sam and Annalise try to salvage their relationship, but are unable to and Annalise leaves for London. Sam later becomes a male model for Stefano Gold and has a relationship with Cody Willis (Peta Brady). This is cut short when Cody is shot during a siege with drug dealers and dies a week later in hospital. Sam blames himself and grieves her death until Cody appears to him as ghostly during a whisky-induced hallucination and tells him to get on with his life. When Sam wakes up, he finds one of Cody's rings in his hand.

Annalise later gets in touch with Sam and tells him she wants to reconcile in London and they can travel Europe together. Sam jumps at the chance and leaves after attending the wedding of Annalise's sister Joanna (Emma Harrison) to Rob Evans (Graham Harvey). Sam sells his Handy Sam's Business to Malcolm Kennedy (Benjamin McNair). Sam and Annalise marry in 2000. Five years later, Sam appears in Annalise's documentary about Ramsay Street and says the girls were the best reason to live on Ramsay Street, although Annalise was the only one for him.

Reception
For his portrayal of Sam, Grieve received a nomination for Most Popular Newcomer at the first National Television Awards. Serena Coneele from Inside Soap stated "At long last, a hunk who isn't squeaky clean is about to burn into Ramsay Street on a motorbike! Sam Kratz looks set to get the Erinsborough women running hell for leather to their make-up bags, and with his smouldering looks, it's not difficult to see why." A writer for the BBC's Neighbours website said that Sam's most notable moment was "Confessing his love for Annalise." Josephine Monroe commented that Sam was "a handsome biker always on the edge of the law". John Millar from the Daily Record thought Sam was "a few shrimps short of the barbie" and added "I have had grave fears about Sam's sanity ever since I spotted a poster for the Elvis film flop Harum Scarum on his wall. If he thought that was good, then there's no hope for him." The Sun-Herald's'' Pamela Jane called Sam "sexy", while her colleague Rachel Browne branded him a "motor bike-riding rough diamond".

References

External links
Sam Kratz at the BBC

Neighbours characters
Television characters introduced in 1994
Fictional models
Male characters in television